Municipal assembly is generally synonymous with town council, a body of citizens who govern a town or municipality.

Municipal assembly may specifically refer to:
 Assembleia Municipal in Portugal
 Municipal assembly (Sweden)
 People's Municipal Assembly in Algeria
 Town meeting in the United States